The Economic Times Awards for Corporate Excellence (also referred as ET Awards) are the awards conferred by The Economic Times in the field of business, corporate and government policies, economies in India. It is an annual awards, conferred in various categories. Since 2017, Deloitte Touche Tohmatsu India LLP (Deloitte) has been the title sponsor of the awards. The 2018 leg of the awards will be held on 22 November in Mumbai.

ET Awards 1998
 Company of the year: Infosys

ET Awards 2002
 Business Leader of the Year: Arun Shourie, Union Minister for Disinvestment
 Businesswoman of the Year: Lijjat Papad
 Entrepreneur of the Year: Jerry Rao of Mphasis BFL
 Company of the Year: Hero Honda
 Emerging Company of the Year: Balaji Telefilms
 Lifetime Achievement: M S Swaminathan, father of the Green Revolution and F C Kohli, father of Indian software
 Corporate Citizen of the Year: Aditya Vikram Birla Group

ET Awards 2004
 Businesswoman of the Year: Kiran Mazumdar-Shaw

ET Awards 2006
 Businesswoman of the year: Mallika Srinivasan, Tractors and Farm Equipment (TAFE) 
 Entrepreneur of the year: H K Mittal, Mercator Lines
 Global Indian of the year: Indra Nooyi, Pepsi
 Business Reformer of the year: P Chidambaram
 Policy Change Agent of the year: Montek Singh Ahluwalia, Planning Commission
 Company of the year: Tata Consultancy Services
 Emerging company of the year: Amtek Auto
 Lifetime Achievement: N Vaghul, ICICI Bank
 Corporate Citizen of the Year: Azim Premji Foundation

ET Awards 2008
 Business Leader of the year: A M Naik, L&T 
 Business Woman of the year: Shikha Sharma, ICICI Prudential 
 Entrepreneur of the year: Dilip Sanghavi, Sun Pharmaceuticals 
 Global Indian of the year: Arun Sarin, Vodafone Group 
 Business Reformer of the year: Kamal Nath, Union Commerce and Industry Minister
 Policy Change Agent of the year: E Sreedharan, Delhi Metro Rail Corporation
 Company of the year: Tata Steel
 Emerging Company of the year: Welspun Gujarat Stahl Rohren
 Lifetime Achievement Award: Ashok Ganguly, former Chairman, HLL 
 Corporate Citizen of the year: Dr Reddy's Foundation

ET Awards 2009
 Business Leader of the year: Anand Mahindra, Mahindra Group 
 Business Woman of the year: Vinita Bali, Britannia Industries
 Entrepreneur of the year: GVK Reddy, GVK Group
 Global Indian of the year: Ram Charan, management guru and thinker
 Business Reformer of the year: Nitish Kumar, Chief Minister of Bihar state
 Policy Change Agent of the year: Jean Dreze, National Rural Employment Guarantee Scheme
 Company of the year: Hero Honda
 Emerging Company of the year: Idea Cellular
 Lifetime Achievement Award: Keshub Mahindra, Mahindra Group
 Corporate Citizen of the year: The Energy and Resources Institute (TERI)

ET Awards 2010
 Business Leader of the year: Aditya Puri, HDFC Bank
 Business Woman of the year: Zia Mody, AZB Partners
 Entrepreneur of the year: Narendra Murkumbi, Renuka Sugars
 Global Indian of the year: Nitin Nohria, Dean, Harvard Business School
 Business Reformer of the year: Kapil Sibal, minister of human resources development
 Policy Change Agent of the year: Aruna Roy and Arvind Kejriwal,  — the founders of Parivartan
 Company of the year: Larsen & Toubro
 Emerging Company of the year: Cadila Healthcare
 Lifetime Achievement Award: R. C. Bhargava, the non-executive chairman of Maruti Suzuki

ET Awards 2011
 Business Leader of the year: Chanda Kochhar, ICICI Bank
 Entrepreneur of the year: Rahul Bhatia, Indigo Airlines
 Global Indian of the year: Vikram Pandit, Citi Bank
 Policy Change Agent of the year: Nandan Nilekani
 Company of the year: Bajaj Auto
 Emerging Company of the year: Shree Renuka Sugars
 Lifetime Achievement Award: Yaga Venugopal Reddy,  Former Governor of the Reserve Bank of India

ET Awards 2012
 Business Leader of the year: Anil Agarwal
 Corporate Citizen of the year: Aditya Birla Group
 Entrepreneur of the year: Devi Prasad Shetty
 Global Indian of the year: Anshu Jain
 Policy Change Agent of the year: Sam Pitroda
 Company of the year: HDFC Bank
 Emerging Company of the year: Jubilant FoodWorks
 Lifetime Achievement Award: PRS Oberoi

ET Awards 2017
Deloitte was the title sponsor for the event, held on 28 October 2017 in Mumbai.
ET AWARDS FOR CORPORATE EXCELLENCE
The Economic Times Awards for Corporate Excellence

 Lifetime Achievement Award: YC Deveshwar, Chairman, ITC
 Business Leader of the Year: Mukesh Ambani, Chairman and MD, Reliance Industries
 Entrepreneur of the Year: Bhavish Aggarawal, Co-founder & CEO, Ola Cabs
 Global Indian of the Year: Prem Watsa, Chairman & Chief Executive, Fairfax Financial Holdings
 Business Reformer & Policy Change Agent: Arun Jaitley, Union Minister of Finance and Corporate Affairs

ET Awards 2018
The Economic Times Awards for Corporate Excellence

The 2018 leg of the awards will be held on 17 November 2018 in Mumbai. Deloitte continues to be the title sponsor of the event.

The jury for the awards met on 4 September 2018 in Mumbai. It comprised:
 Aditya Puri: Managing Director, HDFC Bank
 Nandan Nilekani: Chairman, Infosys
 Harish Manwani: Independent Director, Tata Sons
 Uday Kotak: MD, Kotak Mahindra Bank
 Ritesh Agarwal: Founder, OYO Rooms
 Vijay Shekhar Sharma: Founder, Paytm
 Kalpana Morparia: CEO, South and South East Asia, JP Morgan
 Cyril Shroff: Managing Partner, Cyril Amarchand Mangaldas

The jury members also participated in a panel discussion on the topic, "Spurring equitable growth: role of government, technology, and business". They were joined in the panel discussion by N. Venkatram, Managing Partner and CEO, Deloitte India.

2018 award winners:
 Lifetime Achievement Award: Adi Godrej: Chairman, Godrej Group
 Business Leader of the Year: Sanjiv Bajaj, Managing Director, Bajaj Finserv
 Entrepreneur of the Year: Sumant Sinha, Chairman & MD, ReNew Power Ventures
 Global Indian: Shantanu Narayen, CEO, Adobe Systems
 Business Performer of the Year: K. Chandrashekar Rao, Chief Minister, Telangana
 Company of the Year: HDFC Bank
 Emerging Company of the Year: Page Industries
 Policy Change Agent of the Year: National Payments Corporation of India (NPCI)
 Corporate Citizen: Hindustan Unilever

ET Awards 2019
The Economic Times Awards for Corporate Excellence

The 2019 leg of the awards will be held on 30 November 2019 in Mumbai. Deloitte continues to be the title sponsor of the event.

The jury for the awards met on 25 September 2019 in Delhi. It comprised:
 Anu Aga
 Nandan Nilekani
 Bhavish Aggarwal: Co-founder, OLA Cabs
 Sunil Mittal: Founder and Chairman, Bharti Enterprises
 Kalpana Moraparia:  Chief Executive Officer, JP Morgan India
 Pawan Munjal: Chairman, Managing Director & CEO, Hero Motocorp
 Sadhguru: Founder, Isha Foundation
 Uday Shankar: chairman and CEO, Star India
 Cyril Shroff: Managing Partner, Cyril Amarchand Mangaldas

ET Awards 2020 
The Economic Times ET Rise, India’s Fastest Growing MSME 2020 Awards

 Vivifi India Finance Pvt Ltd
 Kor Energy (India) Pvt Ltd
 Epimoney Pvt Ltd
 Upcurve Business Services Pvt Ltd (udChalo)
 Star Trace Pvt Ltd
 3M Digital Networks Pvt Ltd
 Imperative Business Ventures Pvt Ltd
 Vedehi Constructions LLP
 GEIE Solar Products India Pvt Ltd
 Sai Bio Organics

The Economic Times ET Rise, India’s Top Performing MSME 2020 Awards

 Clairvoyant India Pvt Ltd
 REConnect Energy Solutions Pvt Ltd
 Rotomag Motors And Controls Pvt Ltd
 Asian Consulting Engineers PvtLtd
 Webkul Software Pvt Ltd
 Acewin Agriteck Limited
 TO THE NEW Pvt Ltd
 Oilmax Systems Pvt Ltd
 Star Trace Pvt Ltd
 Enkebee Infratech India Pvt Ltd

ET Awards 2021 
The Economic Times ET Rise, India’s Fastest Growing MSME 2021 Awards

 Campus Sutra Retail Pvt Ltd
 Dev Milk Food Pvt Ltd
 US Transworld Logistics
 White rivers Media Solutions Pvt Ltd
 Solitaire Overseas 
 Panacea Infosec Pvt Ltd
 UpCurve Business Services Pvt Ltd (udChalo)
 DGS Translogistics India Pvt Ltd
 Satya Exports
 Data cipher solutions pvt ltd

See also

 List of economics awards

References

External links
 

Economics awards
Business and industry awards
Economic development awards
Indian awards
Economy of India
Events of The Times Group
Awards established in 1998
1998 establishments in Maharashtra